The terms Qahtanite and Qahtani (transliterated: Qaḥṭānī) refer to Arabs who originate from South Arabia. The term "Qahtan" is mentioned in multiple ancient Arabian inscriptions found in Yemen. Arab traditions believe that they are the original Arabs.

Traditional Arab genealogy

According to Arab tradition, the Qahtanites are from South Arabia, unlike the Adnanites who are from the north of Arabia descended from Ishmael through Adnan. Arab tradition maintains that a semi-legendary ancestral figure named Qahtan and his 24 sons are the progenitors of Yemen who controlled the Arabian Peninsula known as Qahtani.

The genealogists disagree about the pedigree of Qahțān [himself]. Some trace him back to Ismā'īl b. Ibrāhīm , saying that his [name] was Qahţăn b . al - Hamaysa ' b . Tayman b . Nabt b . Ismā'īl b. Ibrāhīm. Wahb ibn Munabbih and Hishām b. Muhammad al-Kalbi held this genealogy ( as true ). Hisham ibn al-Kalbi quoted his father as saying that he had been contemporaneous with [older] scholars and genealogists who traced Qahțān's pedigree in this way. Other [genealogists] argue that the [name] was Qahţăn b. 'Abir b. Shalakh. Qahtan with the Yoqtan (Joktan) son of Eber (Hūd) in the Hebrew Bible (Gen. 10:25–29).

Among the sons of Qahtan are noteworthy figures like A'zaal (believed by Arabs to have been the original name of Sana'a), Hadhramaut and Jurhum whose descendants formed the second Jurhum tribe which Ishmael learned Arabic from. Another son is Ya'rub, and his son Yashjub is the father of Saba'. All Yemenite tribes trace their ancestry back to this "Saba", either through Himyar or Kahlan, his two sons.

The Qahtani people are divided into the two sub-groups of Himyar and Kahlan, who represent the settled Arabs of the south and their nomadic kinsmen (nomads). The Kahlan division of Qahtan consists of 4 subgroups: the Ta' or Tayy, the Azd group which invaded Oman, the 'Amila-Judham group of Palestine, and the Hamdan-Madhhij group who mostly remain in Yemen.

The Kahlan branch includes the following tribes: Azd (Aus and Khazraj, Bariq, Ghassan, Khuza'a and Daws), Hamdan, Khath'am, Bajila, Madhhij, Murad, Zubaid, Ash'ar, Lakhm, Tayy (Shammar), and Kinda.

Early linguistic connection
The first groups of Semitic speakers that moved northward already developed the early Semitic names derived from triliteral, and sometimes a quadriliteral verb root. These appellations first appeared in early (now extinct) East Semitic languages, especially Akkadian, Assyrian, and Old Babylonian. A closer examination reveals connections with the Central Semitic language family including: Aramaic, Phoenician, Hebrew, and Nabatean, which is closely related to the Southern Semitic languages Minaean, Sabaean, Qatabanian, Awsanian, Hadhrami, Ethiopic, and Himyarite.

Pre-Islamic Qahtani migration out of Arabia
Early Semites who developed civilizations throughout the Ancient Near East gradually relinquished their geopolitical superiority to surrounding cultures and neighboring imperial powers, usually due to either internal turmoil or outside conflict. This climaxed with the arrival of the Babylonians, and subsequently the rivaling Medes and Persians, during the 7th and 6th centuries BCE respectively. Though the Semites lost geopolitical influence, the Aramaic language emerged as the lingua franca of much of the Near East. However, Aramaic usage declined after the defeat of the Persians and the arrival of the Hellenic armies around 330 BCE.

The Ghassanids (ca. 250 CE) were the last major non-Islamic Semitic migration northward out of Yemen. They revived the Semitic presence in the then Roman-controlled Syria. They initially settled in the Hauran region, eventually spreading to Palestine, and Jordan, briefly securing governorship of Syria away from the Nabataeans.

After the rise of Islam 
Between the 7th and the 14th centuries, the Qahtanites became involved in the Arab conquests, migrating to the newly conquered territories and intermingling with the local populations. In the Umayyad era, a blood feud broke out between Qahtanites and the Adnanite tribes of Qays, which continued in various forms and degrees till the nineteenth century in what has become known as the Qays–Yaman rivalry.

See also
Qahtan (disambiguation)
Kahlan 
Hadhramaut
Hakam, Yemen

Notes

References

Further reading

Semitic-speaking peoples
 

History of Yemen
Yemeni tribes
Ancient Arabic peoples
South Arabia